This is a list of cases reported in volume 43 (2 How.) of United States Reports, decided by the Supreme Court of the United States in 1844.

Nominative reports 
In 1874, the U.S. government created the United States Reports, and retroactively numbered older privately-published case reports as part of the new series.  As a result, cases appearing in volumes 1–90 of U.S. Reports have dual citation forms; one for the volume number of U.S. Reports, and one for the volume number of the reports named for the relevant reporter of decisions (these are called "nominative reports").

Benjamin Chew Howard 
Starting with the 42nd volume of U.S. Reports, the Reporter of Decisions of the Supreme Court of the United States was Benjamin Chew Howard. Howard was Reporter of Decisions from 1843 to 1860, covering volumes 42 through 65 of United States Reports which correspond to volumes 1 through 24 of his Howard's Reports. As such, the dual form of citation to, for example, Brockett v. Brockett is 43 U.S. (2 How.) 238 (1844).

Justices of the Supreme Court at the time of 43 U.S. (2 How.) 

The Supreme Court is established by Article III, Section 1 of the Constitution of the United States, which says: "The judicial Power of the United States, shall be vested in one supreme Court . . .". The size of the Court is not specified; the Constitution leaves it to Congress to set the number of justices. Under the Judiciary Act of 1789 Congress originally fixed the number of justices at six (one chief justice and five associate justices). Since 1789 Congress has varied the size of the Court from six to seven, nine, ten, and back to nine justices (always including one chief justice).

Justice Smith Thompson died in December 1843.  The unpopular President John Tyler failed repeatedly to fill the Thompson vacancy, as the Whig-controlled Senate rejected his nominations of John C. Spencer, Reuben Walworth, Edward King, and John M. Read to the Supreme Court.  As a result, the Court had only these eight members during the 1844 term:

Citation style 

Under the Judiciary Act of 1789 the federal court structure at the time comprised District Courts, which had general trial jurisdiction; Circuit Courts, which had mixed trial and appellate (from the US District Courts) jurisdiction; and the United States Supreme Court, which had appellate jurisdiction over the federal District and Circuit courts—and for certain issues over state courts. The Supreme Court also had limited original jurisdiction (i.e., in which cases could be filed directly with the Supreme Court without first having been heard by a lower federal or state court). There were one or more federal District Courts and/or Circuit Courts in each state, territory, or other geographical region.

Bluebook citation style is used for case names, citations, and jurisdictions.  
 e.g.,"C.C.D.N.J." = United States Circuit Court for the District of New Jersey
 e.g.,"D. Mass." = United States District Court for the District of Massachusetts 
 "E." = Eastern; "M." = Middle; "N." = Northern; "S." = Southern; "W." = Western
 e.g.,"C.C.S.D.N.Y." = United States Circuit Court for the Southern District of New York
 e.g.,"M.D. Ala." = United States District Court for the Middle District of Alabama
 "Ct. Cl." = United States Court of Claims
 The abbreviation of a state's name alone indicates the highest appellate court in that state's judiciary at the time. 
 e.g.,"Pa." = Supreme Court of Pennsylvania
 e.g.,"Me." = Supreme Judicial Court of Maine

List of cases in 43 United States (2 How.)

Notes and references

See also
 Certificate of division

External links
  Case reports in volume 43 (2 How.) from Library of Congress
  Case reports in volume 43 (2 How.) from Court Listener
  Case reports in volume 43 (2 How.) from the Caselaw Access Project of Harvard Law School
  Case reports in volume 43 (2 How.) from Google Scholar
  Case reports in volume 43 (2 How.) from Justia
  Case reports in volume 43 (2 How.) from Open Jurist
 Website of the United States Supreme Court
 United States Courts website about the Supreme Court
 National Archives, Records of the Supreme Court of the United States
 American Bar Association, How Does the Supreme Court Work?
 The Supreme Court Historical Society

1844 in United States case law